Emeritus professor Dennis Hardy (born June 1941) is former vice-chancellor of the University of Seychelles (UniSey).

Early life
Dennis Hardy was born in June 1941. He received his advanced education at the University of Exeter from where he graduated with bachelor's and master's degrees in Geography.

Career
Hardy joined the Greater London Council and qualified as an urban planner at University College London. He subsequently became a fellow of the Royal Town Planning Institute. He has a PhD from the London School of Economics.

Hardy was lecturer in social science and urban planning at Middlesex Polytechnic (now Middlesex University) and subsequently head of department, dean, pro vice-chancellor and deputy vice-chancellor. He then became head of the university's campus in Dubai. He was president of the International Communal Studies Association and dean of the Australian Institute of Business.

In February 2014, Hardy became vice-chancellor of the University of Seychelles, a post he held until 2017.

Selected publications
Alternative communities in nineteenth century England. Longman, London, 1979.
Goodnight campers! The history of the British holiday camp. Mansell, London, 1986. (With Colin Ward)
From garden cities to new towns: Campaigning for town and country planning 1899-1946. Routledge, 1991.  (Series No 13: Studies in History Planning & the Environment Series)
Utopian England: Community experiments, 1900-1945. Spon, London, 2000. 
Poundbury: The town that Charles built. Town & Country Planning Association, London, 2005. 
Cities that don't cost the earth, Town and Country Planning Association, London, 2008.
The Urban Sea: Cities of the Mediterranean. Blue Gecko Books, May 2013.

References 

Living people
Academics of Middlesex University
1941 births
Alumni of the University of Exeter
Alumni of the London School of Economics
University of Seychelles